Mycena singeri is a species of agaric fungus in the family Mycenaceae. Described as new to science in 1988 by Jean Lodge, it is bioluminescent. In 2007, the first reported luminescent species were found from a single site in primary Atlantic Forest habitat in the Alto Ribeira Tourist State Park, São Paulo State, Brazil.

See also
List of bioluminescent fungi

References

External links

singeri
Bioluminescent fungi
Fungi described in 1988
Fungi of South America